Entomobrya is a genus of slender springtails in the family Entomobryidae. There are at least 270 described species in Entomobrya.

Selected species

References

Further reading

 

Springtail genera
Collembola